is a Japanese female curler.

At the national level she is a 2018 Japan women's champion.

Teams

Personal life
Her older sister Yuna Kotani is also a curler. They played together on the 2018 World Women's Curling Championship.

References

External links

Arisa Kotani - Curling World Cup player profile

Living people
2000 births
Japanese female curlers
Japanese curling champions
21st-century Japanese women